First Look is a Philippine 30-minute early morning news program on ABS-CBN News Channel anchored by Raine Musngi providing a quick roundup of the top news you need to start your day and gives updates on the overnight business news, and weather from around the world. It airs on weekdays at 5 a.m. Philippine Standard Time.

Anchor
Raine Musñgi

See also
List of programs shown on the ABS-CBN News Channel
ABS-CBN News Channel
ABS-CBN News and Current Affairs

2006 Philippine television series debuts
2015 Philippine television series endings
ABS-CBN News Channel original programming
English-language television shows